

134001–134100 

|-id=003
| 134003 Ingridgalinsky ||  || Ingrid Galinsky (born 1962), the Science Processing and Operation Center Test Lead for the OSIRIS-REx asteroid sample-return mission. || 
|-id=008
| 134008 Davidhammond ||  || Dave Hammond (born 1983), the Science Processing Lead at the Science Processing and Operations Center for the OSIRIS-REx asteroid sample-return mission. || 
|-id=019
| 134019 Nathanmogk ||  || Nathan Mogk (born 1989), a systems engineer at the Science Processing and Operations Center for the OSIRIS-REx asteroid sample-return mission. His previous planetary science work included making DTMs of Mars from HiRISE data and research on three-body-problem dynamics. || 
|-id=027
| 134027 Deanbooher ||  || Daniel "Dean" Booher (born 1971) was the Quality Assurance Manager for OCAMS, the OSIRIS-REx Camera Suite, on the OSIRIS-REx asteroid sample-return mission || 
|-id=028
| 134028 Mikefitzgibbon ||  || Mike Fitzgibbon (born 1962), an OCAMS Software Engineer for the OSIRIS-REx asteroid sample-return mission and for the Space Shuttle missions with the AIS, GLO and UVSTAR instruments, and for a number of planetary missions including Mars Polar Lander, Mars Odyssey, Phoenix, Lunar Reconnaissance Orbiter, MESSENGER and MSL. || 
|-id=034
| 134034 Bloomenthal ||  || H. Philip Bloomenthal (born 1981) worked as a Systems Administrator at the University of Arizona Science Processing and Operations Center for the OSIRIS-REx asteroid sample-return mission. He helped keep the little green lights blinking. || 
|-id=036
| 134036 Austincummings ||  || Austin Cummings (born 1995), a software developer at the Science Processing and Operations Center for the OSIRIS-REx asteroid sample-return mission || 
|-id=039
| 134039 Stephaniebarnes ||  || Stephanie Barnes (born 1984), the SPOC Science Operations Engineer for the OSIRIS-REx asteroid sample-return mission. || 
|-id=040
| 134040 Beaubierhaus ||  || Beau Bierhaus (born 1972) was the science team interface to the spacecraft design and development activities for the OSIRIS-REx asteroid sample-return mission. || 
|-id=044
| 134044 Chrisshinohara ||  || Chris Shinohara (born 1965) was the Science Processing and Operations Center Manager for the OSIRIS-REx asteroid sample-return mission at the University of Arizona. He also worked on the Phoenix and Mars Reconnaissance Orbiter missions. || 
|-id=050
| 134050 Rebeccaghent ||  || Rebecca Ghent (born 1971), a Co-I for the OSIRIS-REx asteroid sample-return mission. She is also a Co-I for the Diviner thermal radiometer on the Lunar Reconnaissance Orbiter mission, and has contributed to the body of knowledge of planetary impacts, regolith development and tectonics. || 
|-id=063
| 134063 Damianhammond ||  || Damian Hammond (born 1972) was the Software Engineering Lead for the Telemetry Processing at the Science Processing and Operations Center, for the OSIRIS-REx asteroid sample-return mission. || 
|-id=069
| 134069 Miyo ||  || Miyo Itagaki (1921–2011), mother of Japanese astronomer Koichi Itagaki, who discovered this minor planet || 
|-id=072
| 134072 Sharonhooven ||  || Sharon Hooven (born 1958), the Senior Business Manager for the OSIRIS-REx asteroid sample-return mission at the University of Arizona. || 
|-id=081
| 134081 Johnmarshall ||  || John Marshall (born 1948), the Asteroid Scientist – Regolith for the OSIRIS-REx asteroid sample-return mission. || 
|-id=087
| 134087 Symeonplatts ||  || Symeon Platts (born 1991), the Senior Videographer for the OSIRIS-REx asteroid sample-return mission at the University of Arizona. || 
|-id=088
| 134088 Brettperkins ||  || Brett Perkins (born 1967), the Launch Site Integration Manager for the OSIRIS-REx asteroid sample-return mission. He served in a similar capacity for the JUNO Jupiter mission and multiple TDRSS missions. During the Space Shuttle Program he served as a test engineer and a NASA Test Director for missions from 1990 through 2011. || 
|-id=091
| 134091 Jaysoncowley ||  || Jayson Cowley (born 1959) is the United Launch Alliance Mission Manager for the OSIRIS-REx asteroid sample-return mission. He has supported NASA with Titan- IV, Delta-II and Atlas-V launch services for the MAVEN, LDCM, WISE, STSS-D and Cassini missions. || 
|-id=092
| 134092 Lindaleematthias ||  || Linda Lee Matthias (born 1968), the KSC/LSP Contamination Control Engineer for the OSIRIS-REx asteroid sample-return mission. Since 1988 she has supported over 70 successful Titan IV and NASA Launch Services Program Missions as the Planetary Protection and Contamination Control Engineer. || 
|-id=099
| 134099 Rexengelhardt ||  || Rex Engelhardt (born 1959), the KSC Launch Services Program Mission Manager for the OSIRIS-REx asteroid sample-return mission. As a Mission Manager, he has led more than 10 missions since LSP was established in 1998. He supported many payload support jobs for NASA Kennedy Space Center and the Air Force. || 
|}

134101–134200 

|-id=105
| 134105 Josephfust ||  || Joseph Fust (born 1958), the United Launch Alliance spacecraft integration engineer for the OSIRIS-REx asteroid sample-return mission. He was the spacecraft integration engineer for the MAVEN mission to Mars. He also serves as spacecraft integrator for various United States Air Force and National Security missions. || 
|-id=109
| 134109 Britneyburch ||  || Britney Burch (born 1982) is a structural dynamics analyst with the NASA Launch Services Program and is the primary loads analyst for the OSIRIS-REx asteroid sample-return mission. She has previously served as an analyst with the Mars MAVEN mission and the Pegasus/IRIS mission. || 
|-id=112
| 134112 Jeremyralph ||  || Jeremy Ralph (born 1983) is the United Launch Alliance Flight Design Engineer for the Atlas V rocket, launching the OSIRIS-REx asteroid sample-return mission to 101955 Bennu. He also assisted on the SDO, MSL and LDCM missions. || 
|-id=124
| 134124 Subirachs || 2005 AM || Josep Maria Subirachs (1927–2014), Catalan sculptor and painter || 
|-id=125
| 134125 Shaundaly ||  || Shaun Daly (born 1979) is the KSC Launch Services Program Integration Engineer for the OSIRIS-REx asteroid sample-return mission. He has served in the aerospace industry since 1997 both for the USAF as a Crew Chief during Operation Enduring Freedom and for NASA as an avionics engineer on 25 missions || 
|-id=127
| 134127 Basher ||  || Benjamin Asher (born 1990) is an Embry-Riddle Aeronautical University alumnus and a member of the flight design team at a.i. solutions, Inc. in support of NASA's Launch Services Program for the OSIRIS-REx asteroid sample-return mission. He is also a member of the flight design team in support of the TESS mission. || 
|-id=130
| 134130 Apáczai ||  || János Apáczai Csere (1625–1659), Hungarian polyglot and mathematician || 
|-id=131
| 134131 Skipowens ||  || Skip Owens (born 1975) is the NASA LSP Integration Engineer for the OSIRIS-REx asteroid sample-return mission. He was also a LSP Flight Design Engineer for over a dozen NASA missions. Before starting with LSP in 2001, he worked spacecraft mission design at Goddard Spaceflight Center for the EO-1 and WMAP missions. || 
|-id=134
| 134134 Kristoferdrozd ||  || Kristofer Drozd (born 1993), a systems engineering graduate student at the University of Arizona. || 
|-id=135
| 134135 Steigerwald ||  || William Steigerwald (born 1967) worked on the OSIRIS-REx asteroid sample-return mission as a science writer. He has worked for over 19 years as a writer for a wide range of NASA missions in planetary science, astrobiology, astrophysics and heliophysics || 
|-id=138
| 134138 Laurabayley ||  || Laura C. Bayley (born 1988) is a student engineer at MIT responsible for test planning and assembly of the student-built Regolith X-ray Imaging Spectrometer aboard the OSIRIS-REx asteroid sample-return mission. || 
|-id=146
| 134146 Pronoybiswas ||  || Pronoy K. Biswas (born 1992) is a student engineer at MIT responsible for designing and implementing the avionics system for the student-built Regolith X-ray Imaging Spectrometer aboard the OSIRIS-REx asteroid sample-return mission. || 
|-id=150
| 134150 Bralower ||  || Harrison L. Bralower (born 1988) worked as a student engineer at MIT where he designed the detector assembly mount for the student-built Regolith X-ray Imaging Spectrometer aboard the OSIRIS-REx asteroid sample-return mission. || 
|-id=160
| 134160 Pluis ||  || Aina Vandenabeele (8 June – 1 December 2004) was the niece of Belgian astronomer Peter De Cat, who discovered this minor planet. Aina, nicknamed "Pluis", died of leukemia. The naming also honors all children with cancer. || 
|-id=169
| 134169 Davidcarte ||  || David B. Carte (born 1991) worked as a student engineer at MIT where he was responsible for the structural design and testing of the student-built Regolith X-ray Imaging Spectrometer aboard the OSIRIS-REx asteroid sample-return mission. || 
|-id=174
| 134174 Jameschen ||  || Shuyi James Chen (born 1988) worked as a student engineer at MIT where he was the lead avionics and software engineer in the development of the student-built Regolith X-ray Imaging Spectrometer aboard the OSIRIS-REx asteroid sample-return mission. || 
|-id=178
| 134178 Markchodas ||  || Mark A. Chodas (born 1990) is a student engineer at MIT working as the Lead Systems Engineer ensuring that all system components meet science requirements for the student-built Regolith X-ray Imaging Spectrometer aboard the OSIRIS-REx asteroid sample-return mission. || 
|-id=180
| 134180 Nirajinamdar ||  || Niraj K. Inamdar (born 1986) worked as a student engineer and scientist at MIT where he conducted the performance modeling in the development of the student-built Regolith X-ray Imaging Spectrometer aboard the OSIRIS-REx asteroid sample-return mission. || 
|}

134201–134300 

|-id=244
| 134244 De Young ||  || Mike De Young (born 1954), American teacher, who ran the Rehoboth Christian School observatory and is the local liaison for the Calvin-Rehoboth Robotic Observatory || 
|-id=292
| 134292 Edwardhall ||  || Edward Hall (1942–2020) earned a Ph.D. at Northwestern University. He was instrumental in the development of silicon-based sensors and gallium arsenide devices at Motorola. Hall later was director of the Arizona State University nanofabrication laboratory and executive associate dean of their School of Engineering. || 
|}

134301–134400 

|-id=329
| 134329 Cycnos || 2377 T-3 || Cycnus (or Cycnos), from Greek mythology. He was one of the many sons of Poseidon with a sea nymphs. In the Trojan War he as an ally of King Priam and was strangled by Achilles. || 
|-id=340
| 134340 Pluto || — || Pluto, Roman god of the Underworld, similar to the Greek Hades (see also (134340) Pluto I Charon, (134340) Pluto II Nix, and (134340) Pluto III Hydra). || 
|-id=346
| 134346 Pinatubo ||  || Mount Pinatubo, active volcano on Luzon island in the Philippines || 
|-id=348
| 134348 Klemperer ||  || Victor Klemperer (1881–1960), German son of a rabbi, who kept a diary of life under the Nazi tyranny, starting in 1933 || 
|-id=369
| 134369 Sahara || 1995 QE || The Sahara desert is the world's largest hot desert. Located in north Africa, it stretches from the Red Sea to the Atlantic Ocean. || 
|}

134401–134500 

|-id=402
| 134402 Ieshimatoshiaki || 1997 RG || Toshiaki Ieshima (born 1955), Japanese amateur astronomer and member of Matsue Astronomy Club. He is an observing partner of Hiroshi Abe who discovered this minor planet. || 
|-id=419
| 134419 Hippothous ||  || Hippothous, from Greek mythology. The Trojan prince and his brothers were cursed by their father, King Priam, for their disgraceful behavior after Hector's death during the Trojan War. || 
|}

134501–134600 

|-bgcolor=#f2f2f2
| colspan=4 align=center | 
|}

134601–134700 

|-bgcolor=#f2f2f2
| colspan=4 align=center | 
|}

134701–134800 

|-bgcolor=#f2f2f2
| colspan=4 align=center | 
|}

134801–134900 

|-bgcolor=#f2f2f2
| colspan=4 align=center | 
|}

134901–135000 

|-bgcolor=#f2f2f2
| colspan=4 align=center | 
|}

References 

134001-135000